Macaulay railway station is located on the Upfield line in Victoria, Australia. It serves the inner northern Melbourne suburb of North Melbourne, and it opened on 1 December 1887 as Macaulay Road. It was renamed Macaulay on 1 May 1909.

The station is located beside the Moonee Ponds Creek to its west, and surrounded mainly by factories and warehouses.

The station is also located at ground level, beneath the CityLink tollway, which is supported atop concrete columns that are located outside the platform fencing.

History

Macaulay station opened on 1 December 1887, three years after the railway line from North Melbourne was extended to Coburg. The station is named after Macaulay Road, itself named after Thomas Babington Macaulay, a British politician and historian.

To the east of the station were a number of goods sidings, which opened after 1919, and have since been removed.

In 1972, automatic signalling was provided between Macaulay and Royal Park, replacing Double Line Block signalling. In that year, boom barriers replaced interlocked gates at the Macaulay Road level crossing, located at the Up end of the station, as well as the abolishment of the signal box. On 1 July 1975, parcel facilities at the station were abolished. In 1976, the current station buildings were provided.

In May 1972, the suburban train stabling yard near the station, located towards North Melbourne, opened, as part of the City Loop project. On 17 November 1993, a light repair facility officially opened in the yard, as part of the closure of the Jolimont Workshops. In 1997, a crossover at the Down end of the station was abolished.

Platforms and services

Macaulay has two side platforms. It is serviced by Metro Trains' Upfield line services.

Platform 1:
  all stations services to Flinders Street

Platform 2:
  all stations services to Upfield

Transport links

Transit Systems Victoria operates one route via Macaulay station, under contract to Public Transport Victoria:
 : Footscray station – East Melbourne

Gallery

References

External links
 
 Melway map at street-directory.com.au

Railway stations in Melbourne
Railway stations in Australia opened in 1887
Railway stations in the City of Melbourne (LGA)